The infratrochlear nerve is a branch of the nasociliary nerve, itself a branch of the ophthalmic nerve.

Structure 
The nasociliary nerve terminates by bifurcating into the infratrochlear and the anterior ethmoidal nerves. The infratrochlear nerve travels anteriorly in the orbit along the upper border of the medial rectus muscle and underneath the trochlea of the superior oblique muscle. It exits the orbit medially and divides into small sensory branches.

Function 
The infratrochlear nerve provides sensory innervation to the skin of the eye lids, the conjunctiva, lacrimal sac, lacrimal caruncle and the side of the nose above the medial canthus.

Etymology 
The infratrochlear nerve is named after a structure it passes under. Infratrochlear means "below the trochlea". The term trochlea means "pulley" in Latin. Specifically, the trochlea refers to a fibrocartilaginous loop at the superomedial surface of the orbit called the trochlea, through which the tendon of the superior oblique muscle passes.

Additional images

References

External links
 
 

Ophthalmic nerve